The Federal Equity Rules were court rules that, until 1938, governed civil procedure in suits of equity in federal courts.

The Rules were established by the United States Supreme Court which was authorized by the United States Congress to make rules governing the form of mesne process, form and mode of proceeding in suits of equity and the power to proscribe form of process, mode of framing and filing of proceedings or pleading and generally regulate the whole process of suits in equity   Sets of rules were promulgated in 1822, 1842 (amended in 1850, 1854, 1861, 1864, 1869, 1871, 1875, 1879, 1882, 1890, 1892, 1893 and 1894), and in 1912 (amended in 1924, 1930 and 1932).  The 1912 Rules were superseded in 1938 by the Federal Rules of Civil Procedure which were largely based on the 1912 Rules.

References 

Equity (law)
1842 in American law
1822 in American law
1912 in American law
United States civil procedure
United States
Civil Procedure